Kenneth Alan "Ken" Richmond (10 July 1926 – 3 August 2006) was an English heavyweight wrestler.

Richmond was born in London. His father abandoned the family when Richmond was 3. Before he got into freestyle wrestling, he was a whale ship crewman.

At 6'5" and 265 lbs, he won a bronze medal at the 1952 Olympics, as well as a bronze medal at the 1950 British Empire Games, and a gold medal at the 1954 British Empire and Commonwealth Games.  He stayed fit enough into his later years to win medals for rollerblading and windsurfing in his 60s.

Though he appeared as the wrestler Nikolas in Jules Dassin's film noir, Night and the City (1950), Richmond was perhaps most recognisable as the shirtless gongman banging the enormous gong preceding the opening credits for films produced or distributed by the Rank Organisation. He was the fourth - and last - actor to take the job. According to the BBC, he had revealed to friends that the gong seen in the Rank Organisation's opening never rang, as it was a papier-mâché stage prop and he never actually struck it with any force, joking "If you hit that gong, you would have gone straight through."

He was a Jehovah's Witness for most of his life, being jailed as a conscientious objector during World War II. In later life, he was a volunteer minister for the organisation. He died at age 80 in his home in Christchurch. (Richmond’s wife, Valentina, died in 1996).

Filmography

References

Bibliography
 London Daily Mirror, 12 August 2006
 BBC Radio 4 Last Word, 18 August 2006

External links
 
 

1926 births
2006 deaths
Sportspeople from London
British conscientious objectors
Olympic wrestlers of Great Britain
Wrestlers at the 1948 Summer Olympics
Wrestlers at the 1952 Summer Olympics
Wrestlers at the 1956 Summer Olympics
Wrestlers at the 1960 Summer Olympics
British male sport wrestlers
Olympic bronze medallists for Great Britain
Wrestlers at the 1950 British Empire Games
Wrestlers at the 1954 British Empire and Commonwealth Games
Wrestlers at the 1958 British Empire and Commonwealth Games
Commonwealth Games gold medallists for England
Commonwealth Games bronze medallists for England
Olympic medalists in wrestling
Medalists at the 1952 Summer Olympics
Commonwealth Games medallists in wrestling
British people in whaling
Jehovah's Witnesses
Medallists at the 1950 British Empire Games
Medallists at the 1954 British Empire and Commonwealth Games